Asda Stores Ltd v Brierley [2021] UKSC 10 is a UK labour law case, concerning equal pay and comparators.

Facts
Women working at Asda supermarkets claimed equal pay to men in Asda's distribution depots. To claim pay is unequal, the Equality Act 2010 requires a real-life comparator. Comparators who work at another establishment have to have ‘common terms’ under the Equality Act 2010 section 79(4)(c) and its predecessor the Equal Pay Act 1970 section 1(6).

The Employment Tribunal, Ryan J, held that the claimants could compare themselves to the male distribution depot workers. The EAT and Court of Appeal dismissed Asda's appeal.

Judgment
The Supreme Court dismissed Asda's appeal. Lady Arden gave the unanimous judgment.

Lord Reed, Lord Hodge, Lord Lloyd-Jones and Lord Leggatt agreed.

See also

UK labour law

Notes

References

United Kingdom labour case law